Peter Howells may refer to:

Peter Howells (economist), Professor of Monetary Economics at the Bristol Business school
Peter Howells (cricketer) (born 1981), English cricketer

See also
Peter Howell (disambiguation)